Sang-e Now is a village in Mian Band Rural District, in the Central District of Nur County, Mazandaran Province, Iran. At the 2006 census, its population was 49, in 11 families.

References 

Populated places in Nur County